The  are a collection of Buddhist temples in eastern Aichi Prefecture, Japan, most of which are near Mikawa Bay. The name is derived from Mikawa Province, the former name for the area.

Thirty-three Kannon

Tōkai Hundred Kannon
The Mikawa Thirty-three Kannon combine with the Mino Thirty-three Kannon in Gifu Prefecture, the Owari Thirty-three Kannon in western Aichi Prefecture and Toyokawa Inari to form the Tōkai Hundred Kannon.

See also 
Tōkai Hundred Kannon
Mino Thirty-three Kannon
Toyokawa Inari
 Glossary of Japanese Buddhism (for an explanation of terms concerning Japanese Buddhism)

External links
Mikawa Thirty-three Kannon

Buddhist temples in Aichi Prefecture